Abazallı (also, Abasalılı, Abazally, and Abasaly) is a village and municipality in the Jalilabad Rayon of Azerbaijan.  It has a population of 771.

References

External links
Satellite map at Maplandia.com 

Populated places in Jalilabad District (Azerbaijan)